The 1973 World Table Tennis Championships were held in Sarajevo from April 5 to April 15, 1973.

Medalists

Team

Individual

References

External links
ITTF Museum

 
1973
1973 in table tennis
1973 in Yugoslavian sport
Table tennis competitions in Yugoslavia
International sports competitions hosted by Yugoslavia
April 1973 sports events in Europe
1973 in Bosnia and Herzegovina
Sports competitions in Sarajevo
1973 World Table Tennis Championships